Air Church, formerly Metro Church (registered as Metro Church Australia), located on the Gold Coast, Queensland, Australia, is a Pentecostal church affiliated with Australian Christian Churches.

History 
The church was started by Garry and Kasey McDonald in 2006 after finishing their duties at SurfCity Christian Church to start a new church. Metro had its official launch in March 2006 at the Gold Coast Convention Centre. After the launch, the church began to host weekly meetings in a rented cinema.

In 2008, Metro received an old church facility at 116 Ridgeway Avenue Southport as a freehold gift. This was renovated and re-opened in August of that year. In late 2018 the Southport building was sold and became a mosque, and Metro Church relocated to its current Varsity Lakes venue on Scottsdale Drive in December the same year. 

In June 2020 allegations about Garry McDonald were taken to the Australian Christian Churches (ACC) from outside of METRO Church. Following an investigation at a state level, and then national level, the ACC decided Pastor Garry had breached the Ministerial Code of Conduct, and as a result, removed his pastors‘ credential. This meant he was immediately stood down from his role as Senior Pastor of METRO Church in line with the church constitution.  

Senior pastors Dave and Jenny Gilpin were appointed on 28 November 2020, after the McDonalds had completed their term. 

"Breakfast at the Palace" was Metro's annual reach out event to bless women on the Gold Coast in December. It started at Versace Palazzo in 2011 and was held at the Gold Coast Convention and Exhibition from 2013. The event was cancelled in 2020. 

The church was renamed to Air Church in August 2021, with its business name changed to Air Church Australia on 17 September 2021. The Gilpin's resigned as senior pastors in May 2022 to do itinerant ministry. Pastors James & Sally Foord were commissioned as the new Senior Pastors on Sunday 29th May.

The board has sued its founder and former director, Garry McDonald claiming he owes nearly $500,000 in unpaid loans and interest.

Description
Air Church is a Pentecostal church affiliated with Australian Christian Churches (the Australian branch of the Assemblies of God). The senior pastors  are James & Sally Foord.

The business entity remains incorporated as Metro Church Australia, and it is still registered as a charitable organisation under this name.

References

External links 
 

Australian Christian Churches
Christian organizations established in 2006
Pentecostalism in Australia
Evangelical megachurches in Australia